Spearhead is an EP by Bolt Thrower. It is recorded at Sawmill studios, produced by Colin Richardson and Bolt Thrower, engineered by John Cornfield. Mixed at Fon studios September 1992, engineered by Alan Fisch and Steve Harris. It is released on Earache Records: Mosh 73 in February 1993, and is now deleted.

Track listing
All songs written by Bolt Thrower

Personnel
 Karl Willetts - vocals
 Gavin Ward - guitars
 Barry Thomson - guitars
 Andrew Whale - drums
 Jo Bench - bass

Bolt Thrower albums
1993 EPs
Earache Records EPs